Kw'adza may refer to:
the Kw'adza people
the Kw'adza language